The year 1591 in science and technology included many events, some of which are listed here.

Mathematics
 François Viète publishes In Artem Analyticien Isagoge, introducing the new algebra with innovative use of letters as parameters in equations.

Technology
 The Rialto Bridge in Venice, designed by Antonio da Ponte, is completed.

Publications
 Prospero Alpini publishes De Medicina Egyptiorum in Venice, including accounts of coffee, bananas and the baobab.
 Publication of the first of the Conimbricenses commentaries on Aristotle by the Jesuits of the University of Coimbra, Commentarii Collegii Conimbricensis Societatis Jesu in octo libros physicorum Aristotelis Stagyritæ, on Aristotle's Physics.

Births
 February 21 – Gérard Desargues, French geometer (died 1661)

Deaths
 July 2 – Vincenzo Galilei, Italian scientist and musician (born 1520)

References

 
16th century in science
1590s in science